The El Bosque Seniors Open was a men's senior (over 50) professional golf tournament on the European Seniors Tour, held at the El Bosque Golf & Country Club in Chiva, Valencia, Spain, west of the City of Valencia. It was held just once, in May 1998, and was won by Tommy Horton who finished nine shots ahead of Noel Ratcliffe. Horton's nine stroke win equalled the record he had set in the 1997 Scottish Seniors Open. Total prize money was £100,000 with the winner receiving £16,660.

Winners

References

External links
Coverage on the European Senior Tour's official site

Former European Senior Tour events
Golf tournaments in Spain